The September 11 attacks of 2001 caused the deaths of 2,996 people, including 2,977 victims and 19 hijackers who committed murder–suicide. Thousands more were injured, and long-term health effects have arisen as a consequence of the attacks. 2,606 of the victims came from the World Trade Center and the surrounding area, while a further 125 were killed at the Pentagon. The remaining 246 were murdered aboard the four hijacked flights―American Airlines Flight 11, United Airlines Flight 175, American Airlines Flight 77 and United Airlines Flight 93. The attacks on the World Trade Center made 9/11 the deadliest act of terrorism in human history.

Most of those who perished were civilians except for 343 members of the New York City Fire Department and 71 law enforcement officers who died in the World Trade Center and on the ground in New York City; a United States Fish and Wildlife Service Office of Law Enforcement officer who died when United Airlines Flight 93 crashed into a field near Shanksville, Pennsylvania; 55 military personnel who died at the Pentagon in Arlington County, Virginia; and the 19 terrorists who died on board the four aircraft. At least 102 countries lost citizens in the attacks.

Initially, a total of 2,603 victims were confirmed to have been killed at the World Trade Center site. In 2007, the New York City medical examiner's office began to add people who died of illnesses caused by exposure to dust from the site to the official death toll. The first such victim was a woman, a civil rights lawyer, who had died from a chronic lung condition in February 2002. In September 2009, the office added a man who died in October 2008, and in 2011, a male accountant who had died in December 2010. This is what raises the number of victims from the World Trade Center site to 2,606, and the overall 9/11 death toll to 2,996.

, medical authorities concluded that 1,140 people who worked, lived, or studied in Lower Manhattan at the time of the attacks have been diagnosed with cancer as a result of "exposure to toxins at Ground Zero". In September 2014, it was reported that over 1,400 9/11 rescue workers who responded to the scene in the days and months after the attacks had since died. At least 10 pregnancies were lost as a result of 9/11. Neither the FBI nor New York City officially recorded the casualties of the 9/11 attacks in their crime statistics for 2001, with the FBI stating in a disclaimer that "the number of deaths is so great that combining it with the traditional crime statistics will have an outlier effect that falsely skews all types of measurements in the program's analyses."

Evacuation 

Most tall buildings in the United States at the time were not designed for complete evacuation during a crisis, even after the 1993 World Trade Center bombing. It was also procedural for announcements in the case of high-rise fire safety for individuals to remain in their offices unless they were near the burning floor. However, after it took ten hours to completely evacuate the towers in the 1993 attacks, multiple additions were made to the buildings and evacuation plans. Radio repeaters were installed in the towers to improve communication, battery powered emergency lights were installed, and fire drills held. Individuals who evacuated for both the 1993 and 2001 attacks reportedly stated they were better prepared for the 2001 evacuations. At least two individuals who had evacuated in both 1993 and 2001 later reported that they had prepared for a potential evacuation after 1993, by bringing either an item such as a flashlight or an emergency preparedness bag with them.

The two World Trade Center buildings housed three stairwells in the center core of each tower. At floors containing lift and ventilation machinery (such as some of the floors where Flight 175 struck WTC 2), the northern and southern stairwells entered corridors extending north and south to stairwells that bypassed the heavy machinery. In the North Tower the stairs were approximately 70 ft apart, compared to the about 200 ft in the South Tower.

At the time of the attacks, media reports suggested that tens of thousands might have been killed. Estimates of the number of people in the Twin Towers when attacked on Tuesday, September 11, 2001, range between 14,000 and 19,000. The National Institute of Standards and Technology estimated that approximately 17,400 civilians were in the World Trade Center complex at the time of the attacks. Turnstile counts from the Port Authority indicate that the number of people typically in the Twin Towers by 10:30 am was 14,154.

It is believed that 1,344 people were on or above floor 92 of WTC 1 when Flight 11 directly impacted floors 93 to 99, and all died. Some 600 people were on or above floor 77 (adjacent to a Skylobby floor) of WTC 2 when Flight 175 struck floors 77 to 85, of whom 18 escaped. Twelve of the people who escaped were among up to 200 people in the Skylobby.

In interviews with 271 survivors, researchers in 2008 found that only about 8.6% had fled as soon as the alarm was raised while about 91.4% stayed behind to wait for more information or carrying out at least one additional task (collecting belongings/calling a family member). The interviews also showed that 82% of those who were evacuating stopped at least once during their way down, due to congestion on the stairs, to take a rest, or due to environmental conditions (smoke/debris/fire/water). Communication breakdowns also hampered the evacuation of workers as one survivor recounted calling 911 multiple times from the South Tower only to be put on hold twice, as 911 operators had a lack of awareness about what was happening and were overwhelmed with the amount of calls, at times repeating incorrect information. Communication issues were also seen as first responders were utilizing different radio channels to communicate, their frequencies were overwhelmed or they had been off duty and responded without their radios.

North Tower 
In the moments after Flight 11 struck the North Tower, the roughly 8,000 people who were not trapped by the impact (everyone from Floor 91 downwards) were faced with a harrowing scenario. The towers of the World Trade Center complex had not been designed to facilitate a mass evacuation of everybody in the buildings, and in each tower there were only three stairwells descending to the ground level. Another hindrance to the evacuation of the World Trade Center was that as the planes struck, the force of the impact caused the buildings to shift enough to jam doors in their frames, and stairwells became blocked by broken wall boards, trapping dozens of people throughout the building, mostly on the floors closer to the impact zone. For those that were above the point of impact, all were trapped, with one victim relaying to 911 after the first plane hit that the stairs were inaccessible for the 106th floor. At least 77 people were freed on the 88th through 90th floors by Port Authority members. They included construction manager Francis "Frank" Albert De Martini, building inspector Pablo Ortiz, engineer Mak Hanna, Environmental Coordinator Pete Negron, and Assistant General Manager Carlos S. da Costa.

Many people began to evacuate via the stairs on their own, while others chose to wait for instructions from the Port Authority of New York and New Jersey. Others who chose to evacuate were also pushed into action by loved ones who had been able to contact them. As evacuees descended the staircases in the North Tower, they were directed to descend to the concourse level beneath the World Trade Center complex, where the mall was located. Others who managed to escape credit the "Survivors Staircase," an outdoor staircase that survived the disaster, and World Trade Center workers who knew escape routes. One survivor stated, "Between the 11th floor and the 9th floor, we wound through this maze. When we got to the plaza level we were walking through and there was one emergency light on. There was water up to our calves. All of a sudden there was a voice. We saw someone in a miner hat. He opened the door and said 'Just keep going.'"

When first responders arrived at WTC 1, teams were ordered to help evacuate occupants of the tower. Within moments of Flight 11's impact, the Port Authority issued a complete evacuation of the North Tower. Survivor Adam Mayblum evacuated the North Tower from his workplace on the 87th floor and shortly after getting to a safe space away from the Towers proceeded to write about his experience.

South Tower 
Meanwhile, in the South Tower, many people saw what had happened in the North Tower and chose to evacuate as a precaution. However, the major hindrance to this process was that for the 17 minutes between the impacts of Flight 11 and Flight 175, it had not yet been determined that a terrorist attack was unfolding, and as a result, the Port Authority in the South Tower spread the word via the building's intercom system and security guards for workers in the South Tower to remain in their offices. In a phone message to his wife by a victim who worked for AON Risk Management, part of the initial announcement can be heard stating: "May I have your attention, please. Repeating this message: the situation occurred in Building 1. If conditions warrant on your floor, you may wish to start an orderly evacuation." A package deliverer told reporters he heard the first crash and as he evacuated he heard: "The building is secure. The safest place is inside; stay calm and do not leave." Others who ignored the message were met with officials at the lobby who told them to return to their respective floors. In a recorded radio conversation about two minutes after the first plane hit, the director of the South Tower stated: "I'm not going to do anything until we get orders from the Fire Department or somebody." This was done in order to avoid overcrowding on the plaza and concourse levels, which was feared would slow the evacuation and rescue operations in the North Tower.

Despite the announcements, thousands of people continued to evacuate the South Tower. In the South Tower between the 78th floor Skylobby and the Observation Deck on the 107th and 110th Floors, there were an estimated 2,000 employees, including 1,100 on the floors occupied by AON Insurance (the 92nd and the 98th through 105th). One of AON's executives, Eric Eisenberg, initiated the evacuation of their floors within moments of the impact of Flight 11; however, the company still lost 175 employees who either chose to stay behind or simply failed to get below the impact zone in the time they had before the plane hit. Similar evacuations were carried out on the floors occupied by Fiduciary Trust, on the 90th, 94th–97th floors, as well as in the offices of Fuji Bank (on floors 79–82), CSC (floor 87) and Euro Brokers on floor 84, which occupied the floors directly above the 78th floor Skylobby. Executives such as Eisenberg instructed their employees to take the stairs down to the 78th floor Skylobby, where they could take an express elevator to the ground level and exit the building. A particularly successful pre-impact evacuation was carried out by Rick Rescorla, head of security at Morgan Stanley. He personally defied an order to stay put and evacuated nearly all of the firm's 2,700 employees in the South Tower moments after the crash of Flight 11.

Many were aided in their evacuation by other building occupants such as Welles Remy Crowther, who was extremely identifiable due to the red bandanna around his mouth, and who helped guide groups of evacuees to safety. Within a window of 17 minutes, between 8:46am and 9:03am, an estimated 1,400 people successfully evacuated from above floor 77 of the South Tower, while roughly 600 people did not.

At the moment of the impact of Flight 175, up to 200 people were in the Skylobby on the 78th floor waiting for elevators. All but 12 of these people then died, as the lobby was struck by Flight 175's wingtip. One of these 12 survivors died a few days later of her wounds.

Pentagon 

As the Pentagon was struck after the World Trade Center, many who worked there did not think the attack would extend past New York City. A media relations specialist who was working in the building at the time recounted years later that she told a coworker, "This is the safest place to be in the world right now." Another was on the phone with his wife and her sixth-grade class when the plane struck, stating the whole building felt like it had been completely lifted off the foundations. He hung up after stating, “We've been bombed, I have to go" before immediately starting to evacuate. Uncertainty about the type of attack led to many being cautious in evacuating with at least one security guard warning of potential shooters laying in wait, to gun down evacuees.

World Trade Center Hotel 

World Trade Center 3 was also known as the World Trade Center Hotel, the Vista Hotel, and the Marriott Hotel. During evacuations of the two larger towers, this 22-story hotel was used as an evacuation runway for about 1,000 people who were evacuated from the area. The guests and others who were evacuated through the hotel were guided by hotel staff through the hotel's bar and outside onto Liberty Street. A policeman was stationed holding the door between the Marriott and Liberty Street, and would periodically hold up the line due to concerns about falling debris or bodies. A paramedic helping in the evacuation process remembered the air being so hot and thick that he had trouble breathing and difficulty seeing, but could hear the alarms of firefighters that had collapsed and needed assistance.

A majority of the registered 940 guests at the hotel began to evacuate after alarms were raised due to a piece of one of the plane's landing gear landing on the top floor of the pool. Some did not immediately do so, with at least one guest recounting that he woke up to the first plane hitting the North Tower and went back to bed only to be awoken by the impact of the plane hitting the South Tower. He then watched the news and took a shower, got dressed, and gathered his belongings before evacuating after watching the South Tower collapse. The delay was in part to many guests being unable to see the damage done to the North Tower from any vantage point on the grounds of the Marriott.

Surrounding area 
Once both towers had been struck, the order to evacuate the North Tower quickly spread to encompass not only the entire World Trade Center complex, but most high rise buildings in Lower Manhattan and surrounding areas as well. The evacuation of employees from the North and South towers continued past the plaza and through the concourse. Evacuees from the North Tower were directed through the underground shopping mall, from where they exited the complex onto Church Street. Evacuees from the South Tower were directed elsewhere to prevent congestion; they were sent across the covered footbridge over West Street to the World Financial Center or to 4 World Trade Center and out onto Liberty Street. Not all evacuees were connected to World Trade Centers, with students from Stuyvesant High School, the Borough of Manhattan Community College, tourists, residents of the area with their pets and others, also involved in the evacuation process.

To relieve congestion within the city and clear the evacuees and civilians, boats and ferries were used to further evacuate Lower Manhattan. Some of the boats were a part of the Coast Guard, others were civilian, company or state-owned, that acted independently or after seeking the permission of the Coast Guard, who initially instructed vessels to stand by and then issued a request for all available boats to participate. One participating vessels crew later recounted the call from Lt. Michael Day of the Coast Guard stating; "All available boats....This is the United States Coast Guard…. Anyone wanting to help with the evacuation of Lower Manhattan report to Governors Island." In total the water evacuation of lower Manhattan moved about 500,000 during the day.

Survivors 

No one survived in, above, or directly below the impact zone in the North Tower. Some 15 people below floor 22 survived the collapse of WTC 1, later escaping or being rescued from the rubble.

Only 14 people escaped from the impact zone of the South Tower (floors 77 to 85) after it was struck by United Airlines Flight 175 at 9:03 am, while a further four escaped from the floors above it. Individuals escaped from the South Tower impact zone using stairwell A in the northwest corner, the only stairwell left intact after the impact. Investigators believe that stairwell A remained passable until the South Tower collapsed at 9:59 am. Because of communication difficulties between 911 operators and FDNY and NYPD responders, most of them were unaware that stairwell A was passable and instructed survivors above the impact zone to wait for assistance by rescue personnel. Despite the relatively few survivors from the impact zone and above, the 9/11 Commission did bring up the possibility of others who may have descended from the point of impact but were unable to make it all the way down before the tower collapsed and killed everybody still within.

After collapses 
After the towers collapsed, only 20 individuals in or below the towers escaped from the debris, including 12 firefighters and three Port Authority police officers. Only 16 individuals who were inside the collapsing North Tower survived and were rescued, and they were all trying to evacuate via stairwell B, located in the center of the building. Four people who were in the concourse area between the Twin Towers survived and either saved themselves or were rescued. Nobody who was in the South Tower at the time of its collapse survived. The last survivor removed from the WTC collapse debris was found in the ruins of the North Tower 27 hours after its collapse.

An unknown number of other people survived the initial collapse, but were buried in air pockets deep beneath the rubble and could not be rescued in time. Some were able to rescue themselves and others from the rubble by climbing through the rubble or digging and listening for sounds of life in order to safely remove the victims from the rubble.

Survivor advocacy 

As of September 28, 2008, a total of over 33,000 police officers, firefighters, responders, and community members have been treated for injuries and sickness related to the 9/11 attacks in New York City, including respiratory conditions, mental health problems like PTSD and depression, gastrointestinal conditions, and at least 4,166 cases of cancer; according to one advocacy group "more cops have died of illness linked to the attack than had perished in it".

Former Daily Show host Jon Stewart and others succeeded in pushing for a law passed by Congress in 2015 that permanently extends health care benefits for the responders and adds five years to the victims' compensation program. Stewart's advocacy on the issue continued into 2019. In June of that year, he testified in front of Congress on behalf of 9/11 first responders who did not have proper health care benefits from the September 11th Victim Compensation Fund. During the testimony he was critical that "Sick and dying, they [first responders] brought themselves down here to speak to no one" and that it was "Shameful" and "...an embarrassment to the country and it is a stain on this institution."

Fatalities

World Trade Center 

An estimated 2,606 people who were in the World Trade Center and on the ground perished in the attacks and on the subsequent collapse of the towers. This figure consisted of 2,192 civilians (including eight EMTs and paramedics from private hospital units); 343 members of the New York City Fire Department (FDNY); and 71 law enforcement officers including 23 members of the New York City Police Department (NYPD), 37 members of the Port Authority Police Department (PAPD), four members of the New York State Office of Tax Enforcement (OTE), three officers of the New York State Office of Court Administration (OCA), one fire marshal of the New York City Fire Department (FDNY) who had sworn law enforcement powers (and was also among the 343 FDNY members killed), one member of the Federal Bureau of Investigation (FBI), one member of the New York Fire Patrol (FPNY), and one member of the United States Secret Service (USSS). This included a bomb-sniffing dog named Sirius, who was not included in the official death toll.

The average age of the dead in New York City was 40. In the buildings, the youngest victim was Richard Pearlman, an 18-year-old emergency medical technician, and the oldest was Albert Joseph, a 79-year-old maintenance worker from Morgan Stanley.

North Tower 
The number of people who died at, above, or one floor below the point of impact is not conclusively known; however, it is estimated that between 1,344 and 1,402 people were on or above Floor 92 when Flight 11 struck and none of them survived. According to the Commission Report, hundreds were killed instantly by the impact while the remainder of the fatalities were from the people trapped by the damage done to the tower. Evidence suggests that approximately 800 people survived the initial crash but were left stranded. The various causes of death ranged from smoke inhalation, immolation, jumping or falling from the upper floors, or the skyscraper's eventual collapse. Although a few people would subsequently be found alive in the rubble following the collapse of the towers, none of these individuals were from above the impact zone.  24 people were still officially listed as missing in 2006 and as of September 2021, the remains of 1,106 victims of the attacks have yet to be identified.

John P. O'Neill was a former assistant director of the FBI who assisted in the capture of 1993 World Trade Center bomber Ramzi Yousef and was the head of security at the World Trade Center when he was killed trying to rescue people from the North Tower. Neil David Levin was the executive director of the Port Authority of New York and New Jersey, which was the governmental entity that built and owned the World Trade Center complex. He was eating breakfast in the Windows on the World restaurant at the time of the attack on the North Tower. Cantor Fitzgerald L.P., an investment bank on the 101st–105th floors of One World Trade Center, lost 658 employees, considerably more than any other employer, and also lost 46 contractors and visitors. Marsh Inc., located immediately below Cantor Fitzgerald on floors 93–100 (the location of Flight 11's impact), lost 295 employees and 63 consultants. Risk Waters, a business organization, was holding a conference in Windows on the World at the time, with 81 people in attendance. Carr Futures, located at the 92nd floor immediately below the point of impact, lost all 69 employees that were in the office that day. The plane did not hit the 92nd floor but the stairwells leading down were rendered impassable by debris and the elevator shafts were severed, making escape impossible. Everyone in the 91st floor survived and escaped.

South Tower 
As with the North Tower, the exact number of those killed at or above the floors of impact in the South Tower has never been verified for definite, although it is estimated that around 600 people were on Floor 77 or higher when Flight 175 struck the tower and only 18 escaped. It is believed that around half of them were killed instantly the moment the plane struck, while the roughly 300 crash survivors were not technically trapped but most still perished, unaware that a means of escape still existed or simply unable to use it in the time they had. Despite having fewer fatalities, the causes of death in the South Tower were still, for the most part, identical to those in the North Tower. The 18 people who escaped before the South Tower collapsed descended using Stairwell A; a further 11 people killed in the attacks are known to have been killed below the impact zone after the crash into the South Tower. The 9/11 Commission notes that this fact strongly indicates that evacuation below the impact zones was a success, allowing most to safely evacuate before the collapse of the World Trade Center.

World Trade Center Hotel 

There is no precise number of deaths that occurred within the hotel as many who sheltered in the hotel during and after the collapse of the South Tower were protected by the reinforced beams that had been installed by the Port Authority after the 1993 bombing. However, the pieces of the South Tower did cause catastrophic damage to the hotel, with many claiming the hotel was cut in half by the falling debris, with survivors stating the pressure picked everyone up and carried them through the air. Hotel employees that were protected by the beams were ordered to evacuate while firefighters remained to attempt to dig out those covered by debris. After the collapse of the North Tower additional debris caused those stuck under the debris to be crushed and killed including two hotel employees; Joe Keller and Abdu Malahi. Additionally at least 41 firefighters who had been attempting to clear the hotel and 11 of the 940 registered guests were killed.

Deaths involving elevators 
A USA Today report estimated that approximately 200 people perished inside the elevators, while only 21 escaped the elevators. However, it was later found that 16% of those who evacuated the South Tower used an elevator and simulations of the evacuation without elevators claim to show that the use of elevators saved about 3,000 individuals in the South Tower. Many elevators did not plunge when the planes crashed through, but were left stranded in the shafts, leaving their occupants to be burned alive in the fires or trapped and unable to escape before the towers collapsed. With the exception of one case, a locking mechanism prevented people from escaping from opening the doors on stranded elevators. One survivor recounted having to pry open a narrow gap between the doors of the elevator to escape by utilizing the stairs. Similarly, a group of six found themselves trapped inside a North Tower elevator from the moment of impact until 9:30 a.m., when they managed to escape by prying open the doors and tunnelling their way through the sheetrock wall of the elevator shaft behind, still leaving them with nearly an hour to spare until the building gave way.

Deaths by jumping and falling 

As the fires raged inside the towers, numerous people plummeted to their deaths from the impact zones and above, landing on the streets and rooftops of neighboring buildings far below at speeds of almost —insufficient to cause unconsciousness during the fall but enough to cause instantaneous death upon impact. Out of the people seen falling from the World Trade Center, at least 200 of them came from the North Tower, with as few as three people spotted jumping or falling from the South Tower. In spite of the extremely small number of people seen falling from the South Tower, a secondary casualty was seen when one of these three landed on firefighter Danny Suhr as he prepared to enter the South Tower near West and Liberty streets, crushing his skull and killing him.

Most of the people falling from the towers deliberately jumped to their deaths to escape the heat, smoke and flames, although some of them had not intended to jump, but lost their grip or footing when being near or outside of the windows or while climbing down the side of the towers from the impacted floors or above. A few people were observed trying to use fabric such as their clothing to slow their descent, but to no avail as the speed of the fall ripped their makeshift parachutes from their hands. The first recorded jumper was seen leaping from the 93rd floor of the North Tower at 8:51 a.m., only 5 minutes after Flight 11 struck the building. The three people spotted falling from the South Tower all came from the same window and were a mix of individuals who slipped while in the process of climbing down or had jumped; all three fell within minutes of each other from the south side of the 79th floor shortly after 9:30 a.m., a fact highlighted in the NIST report. Eyewitnesses reported that although most of them jumped alone, some were seen jumping in groups, with one survivor claiming to have seen as many as six people all holding hands as they fell. Despite how grim conditions became directly beneath Flight 11's impact zone, it is not entirely clear if any of the jumpers were from Floor 92, although an employee trapped on that floor named Thomas McGinnes mentioned in a phone call that through the windows he could see people jumping from the floors above his. While McGinnes would not have been able to see what was happening elsewhere on his floor as a result of being trapped in a conference room, this would imply that all of the jumpers were from the 93rd floor up.

None of the people who were filmed or photographed falling from the towers have ever been officially identified, including the person whose picture became known as The Falling Man. The collapse of the towers before the jumpers' remains could be removed from the scene made it impossible to identify the jumpers through DNA analysis, with a spokeswoman for the New York Medical Examiner's Office pointing out that their bodies were in far too similar a state to those who were crushed in the collapse to distinguish them. In seeking to determine where conditions were most dire and in particular which floors the fires were at their most intense, NIST analyzed video footage and photographs of people jumping or falling. Although they officially counted 104 people who fell―101 of whom came from the North Tower―they noted in their report that this figure likely understates the true number of those who died in this manner. The sight and sound of these individuals falling from the towers, then "smashing like eggs on the ground" horrified and traumatized many witnesses. The jumpers' death certificates state the cause of death as "blunt trauma" due to homicide. Some of the occupants of each tower above its point of impact made their way upward toward the roof in hope of helicopter rescue, only to find the roof access doors locked. Port Authority officers attempted to unlock the doors but control systems would not let them; in any case, thick smoke and intense heat would have prevented rescue helicopters from landing.

The comparably high number of jumpers from the North Tower can be partially attributed to Flight 11's impact zone being located in the center of the tower. This resulted in the entrapment and eventual deaths of everyone who was at, above, and even a floor below the point of impact. All three stairwells were destroyed or blocked by rubble and the elevators were rendered inoperable, preventing any form of escape. Those above the point of impact in the South Tower may not have been trapped, with the northwesternmost stairway (Stairway A) still being traversable as a result of Flight 175's impact being off-center into the southeast corner of the building and tilted at a severe angle. While only 18 people from the crash zone are confirmed to have escaped the building using Stairwell A, the 9/11 Commission Report also noted one NYPD unit that encountered around a large group of civilians making their way down through an unidentified stairwell shortly before the tower's collapse, opening up the possibility that others from at or above the impact zone could have found the staircase but simply failed to descend it in time before the tower fell.

The North Tower had also been hit considerably higher up than the South Tower, with the smoke and fire being confined to 17 floors instead of 33. This meant the smoke was far denser and conditions were less survivable in turn. While approximately 800 people in the North Tower who survived the impact were restricted to a much smaller number of floors, the estimated 300 people who were not killed by Flight 175's crash had more room to maneuver between floors in the South Tower and move away from the smoke and flames. It is also worth noting that many people in the South Tower evacuated as soon as the first jet struck the North Tower, leading to there being far fewer people above the point of impact—roughly 600, less than half that of the North Tower, where at least 1,344 people were either killed outright or trapped with no way down. It is further believed that around half of these 600 occupants were killed instantly the moment the plane hit, which would have left less survivors to jump.

Conspiracy theories 

Contrary to some conspiracy theories about Jewish people being warned not to go to work that day, the number of Jewish people who died in the attacks is variously estimated at between 270 and 400, based on the last names of the dead.

List of the dead 
The following list details the number of deaths reported by companies in business premises at the World Trade Center. The list includes WTC tenants (all buildings), vendors, visitors, independent emergency responders, as well as some hijacked passenger-related firms.

Pentagon 

At least 125 people working at the Pentagon were killed, most of whom worked for the United States Army or the United States Navy. Of those 125 deaths, 70 were civilians – 47 Army employees, six Army contractors, six Navy employees, three Navy contractors, seven Defense Intelligence Agency employees, and one Office of the Secretary of Defense contractor – and 55 were members of the United States Armed Forces – 33 Navy sailors and 22 Army soldiers. Lieutenant General Timothy Maude, an Army Deputy Chief of Staff, was the highest-ranking military official killed at the Pentagon.

Aboard the four planes 
The 265 fatalities aboard the four planes included:
 87 civilians (including 11 crew members) and the five hijackers aboard American Airlines Flight 11
 60 civilians (including 9 crew members) and the five hijackers aboard United Airlines Flight 175
 59 civilians (including 6 crew members) and the five hijackers aboard American Airlines Flight 77
 39 civilians (including 7 crew members), a United States Fish and Wildlife Service Office of Law Enforcement officer, and the four hijackers aboard United Airlines Flight 93.

The dead included eight children: five on American Airlines Flight 77, aged 3 to 11, and three on United Airlines Flight 175, aged 2, 3, and 4. The youngest victim was a two-and-a-half-year-old child on Flight 175 and the oldest was an 85-year-old passenger on Flight 11. Among those were killed on Flight 11 including television producer David Angell, who co-created the sitcom Frasier, Wings, actress Berry Berenson, widow of Anthony Perkins. Filmmaker Carolyn Beug, who produced the music video Right Now by Van Halen, and astronaut Charles Edward Jones.  was another passenger on Flight 11. Ice hockey players Garnet Bailey and Mark Bavis were travelling on Flight 175 when it was hijacked. Barbara Olson, television political commentator and the wife of then-U.S. Solicitor General Theodore Olson, and women's gymnastics coach Mari-Rae Sopper were aboard Flight 77.

Deaths by stabbing or slashing
While almost all of the passengers and crew who perished on the flights were killed instantly in the ensuing plane crashes, some were murdered with knives or boxcutters during the hijackings. It is believed this occurred at least once on Flight 11 and twice on flights 175 and 93. There were no reports of hijackers being violent in any way on Flight 77, although it was noted that they were carrying knives regardless and threatened their hostages with them. It is suspected that on Flight 11, passenger Daniel Lewin had his throat slit after attempting to prevent the hijacking in some way or simply as a result of the terrorist trying to instill the other victims with fear, while Mark Rothenberg on Flight 93 may have been killed for the same reasons. One passenger aboard Flight 93 said a flight attendant who had been killed without identifying who she was specifically, while a process of elimination determined that Rothenberg was also murdered in the early stages of the hijacking. On Flight 11, crew members Betty Ong and Amy Sweeney separately reported that several people had been attacked with knives, including a man (Lewin) who had his throat slashed. Shortly after Flight 175 was commandeered by the terrorists, flight attendant Robert Fangman specifically mentioned that both pilots had been killed, adding that other crew members were non-fatally injured.

At the time of the September 11 attacks, items such as firearms and pepper spray were categorized as hazardous and could not taken on-board without the airline's permission. On the other hand, pocket utility knives with a blade less than four inches in length were not prohibited, a fact the hijackers clearly took advantage of to carry out their plan.

Foreign deaths 

Excluding the 19 perpetrators (15 of whom came from Saudi Arabia, two from the UAE, and one each from Egypt and Lebanon), at least 372 people from 102 countries besides the United States died. The following is a list of the nationalities of the foreign victims:

After the attacks 

During the attacks and afterwards, there was a large amount of toxic dust, debris and ash that was centralized around Ground Zero and created long-term health problems. Toxic materials such as asbestos, lead, and mercury were in the air and the debris, and many victims and first responders did not wear respirators.

It was reported in 2018 that at least 15 FBI agents had died from cancer due to their roles in the aftermath and investigation of the attack. Further, a medical director of the World Trade Center Health Program at Mount Sinai Hospital reported in 2018 that out of the approximately 10,000 first responders and others who were at Ground Zero and have developed cancer as a result, more than 2,000 have died due to 9/11 related illnesses. The Uniformed Firefighters Association of Greater New York also reported over 170 deaths of firefighters due to 9/11-related illnesses, and that roughly 1 in 8 firefighters who were at Ground Zero have developed cancer. At least 221 policemen have died in the years since 2001 from illnesses related to the attacks in New York City.

In 2020, the NYPD confirmed that 247 NYPD police officers had died due to 9/11-related illnesses. In September 2022, the FDNY confirmed that the total number of firefighters that died due to 9/11-related illnesses was 299. Both agencies believe that the death toll will rise dramatically in the coming years. The Port Authority of New York and New Jersey Police Department (PAPD), which is the law enforcement agency which has jurisdiction over the World Trade Center due to the Port Authority of New York and New Jersey owning the site, has confirmed that four of its police officers have died of 9/11-related illnesses. The chief of the PAPD at the time, Joseph Morris, made sure that industrial-grade respirators were provided to all PAPD police officers within 48 hours and decided that the same 30 to 40 police officers would be stationed at the World Trade Center pile, drastically lowering the number of total PAPD personnel who would be exposed to the air. The FDNY and NYPD had rotated hundreds, if not thousands, of different personnel from all over New York City to the pile which exposed so many of them to dust that would give them cancer or other diseases years or decades later. Also, they weren't given adequate respirators and breathing equipment that could have prevented future diseases.

Forensic identification 
Identifications through DNA can be made by comparing the DNA profile of reference samples with those found in the human remains, through obtaining samples from personal items (toothbrush/hairbrush), banked biological samples, relatives, or other identified remains. The extreme heat, pressures and contamination from the collapse of the buildings has caused some of the DNA to become degraded and unusable. Samples were also degraded because some body fragments remained in the rubble for 8 to 10 months. In response to this, the medical examiner's office and other scientific groups created new techniques to process the bone fragments. The Associated Press reported that the medical examiner's office possesses "about 10,000 unidentified bone and tissue fragments that cannot be matched to the list of the dead". Bone fragments were still being found in 2006 as workers prepared the damaged Deutsche Bank Building for demolition.

In order to extract the DNA, medical examiners pulverize the fragments, and compare the extracted DNA to the collection of genetic material from victims and/or their relatives, with scientists revisiting bone fragments multiple times in an attempt to identify the victims.

Identification 
, a total of 2,753 death certificates had been filed relating to the attacks. Of these, 1,588 (58%) were forensically identified from recovered physical remains.

On April 17, 2013, five possible remains were recovered after being sifted at Fresh Kills Landfill on Staten Island. The medical examiner said evidence of a possible victim of the attacks was recovered as well two days later. On June 21, 2013, the medical examiner's office matched its 1,637th victim, a 43-year-old woman, to its list of victims as a result of DNA testing of debris collected from the site. By family request, her name was not released. On July 5, 2013, the medical examiner's office identified the remains of FDNY firefighter Lt. Jeffrey P. Walz, 37, after they were retested. His remains were recovered months after the attack and was the 1,638th victim forensically identified.

On August 7, 2017, the medical examiner's office matched its 1,641st victim. The victim was identified through retesting of DNA from remains recovered in 2001. In 2017 it was reported that only 1,641 victims, or just under 60%, had identified remains.

On July 25, 2018, the medical examiner's office matched its 1,642nd victim. The victim, 26-year-old Scott Michael Johnson, was identified through the retesting of DNA from remains recovered in 2001.

, three additional victims were successfully identified over the course of the year, bringing the total number of identified victims to 1,645. 1,108 remaining victims, representing 40% of those who perished in the World Trade Center attacks were still yet to be identified.

In 2021, four days before the 20th anniversary of the attacks, the New York City Medical Examiner's Office announced that the identification of the 1,646th and 1,647th persons: Dorothy Morgan of Hempstead, Long Island, and an unnamed man whose identity was withheld at the request of his family. , there are still 1,106 victims whose remains have yet to be identified.

See also 
 List of fatal victims of the September 11 attacks
 Health effects arising from the September 11 attacks
 Alicia Esteve Head, self-proclaimed survivor of the attacks who was later revealed to be a fraud
 Killing of Henryk Siwiak  aside from the terrorist attacks, the only homicide recorded in New York City for September 11, 2001
 September 11th Families for Peaceful Tomorrows
 World Trade Center Health Program

Notes

References

Further reading 
 
 
  The story of Carol O'Neill, wife of a founder of Sandler O'Neill, which lost 67 of 180 employees.

External links 
 
  
 
 

September 11 attacks